The Diocese of Harrisburg is a Latin Church ecclesiastical territory or diocese of the Catholic Church that covers 15 counties of South Central Pennsylvania: Adams, Columbia, Cumberland, Dauphin, Franklin, Juniata, Lancaster, Lebanon, Mifflin, Montour, Northumberland, Perry, Snyder, Union and York.  The seat of the bishop is in St. Patrick's Cathedral (built 1907), which stands one block away from the Pennsylvania State Capitol. Pope Pius IX erected the diocese on March 3, 1868. The Diocese of Harrisburg is a suffragan diocese of the metropolitan Archdiocese of Philadelphia.

Bishops

Bishops of Harrisburg
 Jeremiah F. Shanahan (1868-1886)
 Thomas McGovern (1888-1898)
 John W. Shanahan (1899-1916), brother of first bishop
 Philip R. McDevitt (1916-1935)
 George L. Leech (1935-1971)
 Joseph T. Daley (1971-1983; coadjutor bishop 1967-1971)
 William Henry Keeler (1983-1989), appointed Archbishop of Baltimore (Cardinal in 1994)
 Nicholas C. Dattilo (1990-2004)
 Kevin C. Rhoades (2004-2010), appointed Bishop of Fort Wayne-South Bend
 Joseph P. McFadden (2010-2013)
 Ronald William Gainer (2014–present)

Former auxiliary bishops
 Lawrence F. Schott (1956-1963)
 Joseph Thomas Daley (1963-1967), appointed Coadjutor Bishop of Harrisburg
 William Henry Keeler (1979-1983), appointed Bishop of Harrisburg

Other priests of the diocese who became bishops
 David M. O'Connell, C.M., appointed  Coadjutor Bishop of Trenton in 2010 and subsequently succeeded to that diocese
 William J. Waltersheid, appointed Auxiliary Bishop of Pittsburgh in 2011
 Edward C. Malesic, appointed Bishop of Greensburg in 2015

High schools
 Bishop McDevitt High School
 Delone Catholic High School
 Lancaster Catholic High School
 Our Lady of Lourdes Regional High School
 Trinity High School
 York Catholic High School

Ban on participation of females in certain sports
On October 1, 2014, Bishop Ronald Gainer introduced a new policy prohibiting girls at Catholic schools in the diocese from participating in wrestling, football, and rugby whether or not they desire to compete in girls-only or co-ed matches. The policy goes on to require male wrestlers to forfeit matches against female opponents, but does not bar football or rugby teams from playing against teams which may have a girl on their team. According to the policy, the ban applies to sports "... that involve substantial and potentially immodest physical contact." In 2016, public high school J.P. McCaskey exploited the policy to win a dual wrestling match against Delone Catholic.

Special churches
The Basilica of the Sacred Heart of Jesus in Conewago Township and the Basilica of Saints Cyril and Methodius in Danville are under the purview of the diocese.

Sexual abuse cases

In early 2016, a grand jury investigation, led by Pennsylvania Attorney General Josh Shapiro, began an inquiry into sexual abuse by Catholic clergy in six Pennsylvania dioceses:  Harrisburg, Allentown, Scranton, Pittsburgh, Greensburg, and Erie.  The Diocese of Altoona-Johnstown and the Archdiocese of Philadelphia were not included, as they had been the subjects of earlier investigations.

According to officials in the Diocese of Harrisburg, the diocese had intended to release a list of accused priests in September 2016, but were ordered by the Attorney General Shapiro not to do so, lest it compromise his investigation.

According to The Philadelphia Inquirer, in 2017 the Diocese of Harrisburg and the Diocese of Greensburg attempted to shut down the grand jury investigation.

On July 27, 2018, the Pennsylvania Supreme Court ordered that a redacted copy of the grand jury report be released to the public; this release is anticipated to occur in early August 2018.

On August 1, 2018, the Diocese of Harrisburg released the names of 71 clergy members accused of engaging in sexual abuse of children.  The list included priests, deacons, and seminarians of the diocese, as well as clergy from other dioceses or from religious orders who had served in the Diocese of Harrisburg.

Following the disclosure, Bishop Gainer announced the name of every man who had served as a bishop in the Diocese of Harrisburg since 1947 would be removed from any building or room named in their honor, due to their failure to protect victims from abuse. The grand jury report was released on August 14, 2018 and revealed that the Diocese of Harrisburg had secretly been settling cases with survivors of sex abuse in the Diocese since 2002. Some of the agreements in the settlements also included confidentiality provisions. Gainer afterwards apologized on behalf of the Diocese and set up a new website titled Youth Protection Home Page, which contains information on how to report sex abuse, contact information for the Victim Assistance Office, and how the Diocese confronted the issue of sex abuse.  A total of 301 priests were accused of sexually abusing children, with 45 coming from the Diocese of Harrisburg.

The grand jury report also accused former Bishop and future Baltimore Cardinal William Keeler of committing criminal inaction during his time as Bishop of Harrisburg.  It was announced on August 15, 2018 that a Baltimore pre K-8 Catholic school that would open in 2020 and be named for former Harrisburg Bishop William Keeler would no longer bear his name after the report explained how he allowed abusive Harrisburg priest Arthur Long to transfer to the Archdiocese of Baltimore after he (Keeler) was appointed to that see.  Keeler had been notified of accusations of sexual abuse against Long in 1987.

In August 2019, Diocese officials issued a written statement acknowledging that the Diocese of Harrisburg had secretly paid $12.1 million to victims of clergy who sexually abused them while serving in the Diocese.

Bankruptcy
On February 19, 2020, the Diocese of Harrisburg filed for bankruptcy in light of the sex abuse lawsuits. The Diocese is the first in the state of Pennsylvania to do so. In its bankruptcy filing, the Diocese, which is also facing new sex abuse lawsuits, stated that it was struggling financially and had only $1 to $10 million in assets and $50 million in liabilities.

John G. Allen
On November 5, 2020, former York County Catholic priest John G. Allen, who was laicized by 2019 amid claims of molesting children, pled guilty to six misdemeanors — two counts each of indecent assault against a child under 13, indecent assault of a child under 16 and corruption of minors between 1997 and 2002.

See also

 Catholic Church by country
 Catholic Church in the United States
 Ecclesiastical Province of Philadelphia
 Global organisation of the Catholic Church
 List of Roman Catholic archdioceses (by country and continent)
 List of Roman Catholic dioceses (alphabetical) (including archdioceses)
 List of Roman Catholic dioceses (structured view) (including archdioceses)
 List of the Catholic dioceses of the United States

References

External links
 Roman Catholic Diocese of Harrisburg Official Site

 
Religion in Lancaster, Pennsylvania
Religious organizations established in 1868
Harrisburg
Harrisburg
1868 establishments in Pennsylvania
Companies that filed for Chapter 11 bankruptcy in 2020